Henryk Kierzkowski (born 10 October 1943) is a Polish economist known for his work on imperfect competition and international trade.

Kierzkowski was a senior economist at the Bank of Canada, Deputy Chief-Economist of the European Bank for Reconstruction and Development in London, economic advisor to the governments of Poland and Albania, and has been appointed for putting forward candidates for the Nobel Prize in Economics. His book Monopolistic Competition and International Trade "helped to launch the New Trade Theory". With Ronald W. Jones, he collaborated "to develop the theory of fragmentation of production".

Writings
With Ronald Findlay. International Trade and Human Capital: A Simple General Equilibrium Model. In: Journal of Political Economy, vol. 91, no. 6, 1983, p. 957-978.
 Monopolistic Competition and International Trade. Oxford: Oxford University Press, 1989.  Synopsis

References

1943 births
Living people
Polish economists
University of Warsaw alumni
Queen's University at Kingston alumni
Academic staff of the University of Geneva